Count Christophe de Villeneuve-Bargemon (1771–1829) was a French aristocrat and civil servant.

He was born into an aristocratic family of Spanish origin, on June 27, 1777 in Bargemon, Provence.

De Villeneuve-Bargemon was appointed Prefect of Lot-et-Garonne in 1806, and in 1816, Prefect of Bouches-du-Rhône. In this capacity, he commissioned the Porte d'Aix in Marseille.

He died on October 13, 1829.  The Espace Villeneuve Bargemon conference centre in Marseille is named after him.

Bibliography 
Statistique du département des Bouches-du-Rhône

References 

People from Provence
1771 births
1829 deaths
18th-century French military personnel
Counts of France
Prefects of Bouches-du-Rhône
Provencal nobility
Officers of the Order of Saints Maurice and Lazarus
Commandeurs of the Légion d'honneur